The 1899 South Carolina Gamecocks football team represented South Carolina College—now known as the University of South Carolina–as an independent during the 1899 college football season. Led by first-year head coach Irving O. Hunt, South Carolina compiled a record of 2–3.

Schedule

References

South Carolina
South Carolina Gamecocks football seasons
South Carolina Gamecocks football